The CP Women's Open is a women's professional golf tournament managed by Golf Canada. It has been Canada's national championship tournament since its founding in 1973, and is an official event on the LPGA Tour.

History
Originally a three-round (54-hole) tournament for its first six years; it has been a four-round (72-hole) tournament since 1978. From 1979 through 2000, the event was one of the LPGA Tour's four major championships. In 2001, it was replaced in the LPGA's roster of majors by the Women's British Open, an existing event which was already a major on the Ladies European Tour.

In 2007 and 2008, it was the final "winner" event of the LPGA season—i.e., an event in which the winner earns an automatic berth in the LPGA season-ending championship, the LPGA Tour Championship. As of 2009, the LPGA no longer uses this system to determine players who qualify for the Tour Championship. From 2007 to 2009, the CWO was the third richest event on the LPGA Tour, behind only the U.S. Women's Open and the Evian Masters in France. The prize fund was reduced in 2010 and 2012, but the $2.25 million purse remains among the highest on the LPGA Tour.

In 2012, amateur Lydia Ko became the youngest-ever winner of an LPGA Tour event. At 15 years and four months, she surpassed the record set by Lexi Thompson at 16 years and seven months in September 2011. Ko's win also made her only the fifth amateur to have won an LPGA Tour event, and the first in over 43 years. 
She successfully defended her win as an amateur in 2013, and won her third in 2015 as a professional.

In 2018 Brooke Henderson became the first Canadian in 45 years, and only the second ever after Jocelyne Bourassa won the inaugural event in 1973, to win Canada's national open.

Title sponsorship
The tournament was first known as La Canadienne, as the event was held in Quebec. In 1974, it was sponsored by Imperial Tobacco Canada, becoming the Peter Jackson Classic until 1984, after which it became the du Maurier Classic;  both Peter Jackson and du Maurier are cigarettes within the Imperial Tobacco Canada umbrella. Imperial Tobacco Canada's sponsorship ended after 2000 because of Canadian tobacco restrictions.

From 1988 to 2000 both Classique du Maurier Ltée and du Maurier Ltd Classic were official because of Canada's Official Languages Act. In 1988, the tournament added the Ltd/Ltée designation because of the Tobacco Products Control Act. Under the rule, the full name of the manufacturer was required on promotional material as opposed to a tobacco brand name, so Imperial Tobacco registered their brands as separate corporate entities to avoid the ban.

In 2001, the Bank of Montréal took over sponsorship of the event for five years and renamed it the BMO Canadian Women's Open, or Omnium canadien féminin BMO.  It was the first year the tournament was officially called the Canadian Women's Open, a title that the Golf Canada now recognises for all past playings.

In 2006, the Canadian National Railway Company (CN) became the new title sponsor of the event and the championship was called the CN Canadian Women's Open, or Omnium canadien féminin CN.

In November 2013, Canadian Pacific Railway Company took over title sponsorship of the Canadian Women's Open and the event name was changed to Canadian Pacific Women's Open, or Omnium féminin Canadien Pacifique. Canadian Pacific also increased the purse to $2.25 million USD.

1973: La Canadienne 
1974–1983: Classique Peter Jackson Classic
1984–1987: Classique du Maurier Classic
1988–2000: du Maurier Ltd Classic, Classique du Maurier Ltée
2001–2002: Bank of Montreal Canadian Women's Open, Omnium canadien féminin Banque de Montréal
2003–2005: BMO Financial Group Canadian Women's Open, Omnium canadien féminin BMO Groupe financier
2006–2013: CN Canadian Women's Open, Omnium canadien féminin CN
2014–2017: Canadian Pacific Women's Open, Omnium féminin Canadien Pacifique
2018: CP Women's Open, Omnium féminin CP

Winners

Winners since 2001; purses are fixed in U.S. dollars.

^ Since Ko was an amateur, runners-up Inbee Park in 2012 and Karine Icher in 2013 won the $300,000 winner's share.
Note: Green highlight indicates scoring records.

Winners when the event was a major, from 1979 to 2000

Winners before the event became a major in 1979

Multiple champions
Multiple winners as a major championship (1979–2000)
{| class="wikitable"
|-
| style="background: #FFFFCC"|Grand Slam winners ‡
|}

Multiple winners of the event since 1973

(a) - denotes won tournaments as an amateur.

Champions by nationality

1 - 1995 du Maurier winner Jenny Lidback had dual citizenship (Peru and Sweden) at the time of her win.

Future sites
2023 – Shaughnessy Golf & Country Club, Vancouver, British Columbia, TBD.

References

External links

Coverage on the LPGA Tour's official site
Wascana Country Club – 2018 CP Women's Open 

 
LPGA Tour events
Open
Women's major golf championships